Goddess worship may refer to:
The worship of any goddess in polytheistic religions
Worship of a Great Goddess on a henotheistic or monotheistic or duotheistic basis
Hindu Shaktism
The neopagan Goddess movement
Wicca
Dianic Wicca